A pickaroon (or picaroon) is a wood-handled (may be other materials also), metal-topped log handling tool that originates from the Alpine Region where it is called "Sappie, Zapin, Sapine".  It is distinguished from a pike pole by having a shorter handle, no metal point, and an opposite curve to its hook (toward the handle rather than away); and from both a cant hook and peavey by having a fixed hook facing its handle rather than a pivoting one facing away.

A pickaroon with a down-turned point on its hook is known as a sappie or hookaroon; one with an axe blade opposite its hook an axaroon, eliminating the need to carry two tools to manage logs.

See also
 Picaroons Traditional Ales – A New Brunswick brewer named after the common logging tool.

References

External links

 Extensive glossary of tools at YesteryearsTools online magazine

Logging
Mechanical hand tools
Forestry tools